Javorje is a village in the hills between the Selca Sora and the Poljane Sora valleys in the Municipality of Gorenja Vas–Poljane in the Upper Carniola region of Slovenia.

Name
Javorje and names like it (e.g., Javor, Javornik, etc.) are derived from the Slovene common noun javor 'maple', thus referring to the local vegetation. In the past the village was known as Afriach in German.

History
The remnants of a Roman aqueduct have been found in the area, testifying to early settlement. Javorje was the seat of a parish under the medieval Dominion of Freising. During the Second World War, a Partisan attack in October 1943 resulted in the withdrawal of a German police unit from the village. The schoolhouse in Javorje was burned by German forces. In 1944 and 1945 the Partisans operated a school in the village rectory. During an engagement on 7 February 1945, several houses in the village were burned.

Church

The local church is dedicated to Saint Giles. It was originally a Gothic church with an angled apse. Around 1710 it was made taller and renovated in the baroque style. The belfry is from the 16th century. The church was again widened and extended in the 1920s. The three altars are from the late 19th century. The paintings in the church are by Janez Šubic, the altar is the work of Štefan Šubic, and the Stations of the Cross are by Leopold Layer. The village chapel shrine, which contains a Gothic Pietà from 1440, was painted with frescoes by Štefan Šubic in 1861.

Notable people
Notable people that were born or lived in Javorje include:
Luka Jeran (1818–1896), poet, editor of Zgodnja danica, and proponent of the Illyrian movement

Gallery

References

External links 

Javorje on Geopedia

Populated places in the Municipality of Gorenja vas-Poljane